Angka hexops is a species of Southeast Asian spiders in the family Microstigmatidae. It is the only species in the monotypic genus Angka. It was first described by Robert Raven & Peter J. Schwendinger in 1995, and has only been found in Thailand.

References

Microstigmatidae
Spiders described in 1995
Spiders of Asia